Clare Rilloraza Baltazar is a Filipina entomologist. She specializes in systematic entomology and economic entomology. Through her research on Philippine Hymenoptera, Baltazar discovered eight previously undescribed genera and 108 species of parasitic wasps. Her work on Hymenoptera was important to future biological pest control in the Philippines. She was named a National Scientist of the Philippines in 2001.

Early life and education
Clare R. Baltazar was born on November 1, 1927, in San Fernando, La Union.

Baltazar began her studies at the University of the Philippines in 1943. She earned a BSA summa cum laude in entomology in 1947. She then studied economic entomology at the University of Wisconsin, earning an MS in 1950. She studied in the United States from 1955 to 1957 through a two-year fellowship from the Bureau of Plant Industry, Manila. She studied at N.C. State College before earning her PhD in systematic entomology from the University of Wisconsin in 1957.

Career
Baltazar started a catalogue of Philippine Hymenoptera in 1950. During her studies in the United States from 1955 to 1957, she completed a large portion of the catalogue, which was published in 1966. In 1957, she received the first of two Guggenheim Fellowships for the preparation and publishing of the work. She conducted postdoctoral research at the Smithsonian Institution in 1965 and 1966 through the second fellowship. The 1966 monograph, A catalogue of Philippine Hymenoptera, included 235 entries for species of ants.

Through her research on Philippine Hymenoptera, Baltazar discovered eight previously undescribed genera, one subgenus, and 108 species of parasitic wasps. Her work on Hymenoptera was an important precursor to future biological pest control in the Philippines.

In 1979, she wrote Philippine Insects: An Introduction, the first authoritative textbook on insects of the Philippines.

Awards and honours
Baltazar received the Jose Rizal Pro Patria Award from the President of the Philippines in 1980. In 1981, the Philippine Association of Entomologists presented her with the L. B. Uichanco Memorial Award for the Most Outstanding Entomologist. The alumni association of the University of the Philippines College of Agriculture granted her a Distinguished Alumnus Award in 1984. A hybrid of Hibiscus rosa-sinensis was named for her in 2000, Hibiscus rosa-sinensis 'Clare R. Baltazar'.

She was named a National Scientist of the Philippines in 2001.

Described taxa
Baltazar described 108 species of parasitic wasps endemic to the Philippines. She also described the following genera:
Barthasis (1972)
Hybomischos (1961)
Hypsotypos (1963)
Ischnobracon (1963)
Pachymelos (1961)
Millironia (1964)
Sychnostigma (1961)
Triancyra (1961)

Selected publications

References

1927 births
Living people
Hymenopterists
Women entomologists
People from San Fernando, La Union
University of the Philippines alumni
University of Wisconsin alumni
National Scientists of the Philippines